A boss key, or boss button, is a special keyboard shortcut used in PC games or other programs to hide the program quickly, possibly displaying a special screen that appears to be a normal productivity program (such as a spreadsheet application). One of the earliest implementations was by Friendlyware, a suite of entertainment and general interest programs written in BASIC and sold with the original IBM AT and XT computers from 1982 to 1985. When activated (by pressing F10), an ASCII bar graph with generic "Productivity" and "Time" labels appeared. Pressing F10 again would return to the Friendlyware application.

In PC games
The nominal purpose of the boss key is to make it appear to superiors and coworkers that employees are doing their job when they are actually playing games or using the Internet for non work-related tasks. It was a fairly common feature in early computer games for personal computers, because at the time people often did not have home computers and playing at work was their only option. Most boss keys were used to show dummy DOS prompts. The use has faded somewhat, as modern multitasking operating systems have evolved. However, some programs still retain a boss key feature, such as instant messaging clients or their add-ons or comic book viewers like MComix.

The boss key was first used in the Apple II game "Bezare", published by Southwestern Data Systems. The idea of it was proposed by Roger Wagner (founder of Southwestern Data Systems, and later Roger Wagner Publishing) on a hang-gliding trip in Mexico in March, 1981, in a conversation between Roger Wagner and Doug Carlston (of Broderbund Software).  Steve Wozniak, Andy Hertzfeld and a number of other early personal computing pioneers were also part of that event. Wes Cherry, the author of the original Microsoft Solitaire, had included a boss key to display a fake spreadsheet or random C code, but was asked by his superiors to remove this on release.

Another early example of the boss key is in the IBM PC version of Asylum, which clears the screen when F9 is pressed. Certain games have taken the idea of the boss key and used it to comic effect. Infocom's adult-themed Leather Goddesses of Phobos (only the IBM PC version) had a boss key which would hide the game and show a screen designed to look like a Cornerstone database view. Upon closer inspection, however, the screen was not exactly boss safe, being populated with order info on rather ridiculous adult items, including an "inflatable milkman". Sierra On-Line's comedy/sci-fi adventure game Space Quest III had a so-called boss key available from the game's pulldown menu. However, when the user selected it, the screen would cut to black and inform the user that their boss wouldn't be happy if they knew how long the user had been playing the game. It then displayed the total elapsed game time. The first few games in Sierra's Leisure Suit Larry series included a boss key in the pulldown menus (shortcut usually Ctrl+B). However, when this is used, it results in an instantaneous game over with the first game saying "Sorry, but you'll have to restore your game; when you panic, I forget everything!". The boss key for the computer submarine game GATO was the Esc key, which, when pressed, brought up a Lotus 1-2-3 type spreadsheet screen.

Microsoft's implementation
In 1993 Microsoft introduced a five-pack collection of games whose boss button was the ESC key, positioned in the upper left corner of the keyboard, as contrasted to the use of two keys, the CTRL key plus the letter "B" (for "boss"). Moreover, to demonstrate the power of Windows, it could fill the entire screen or just a portion thereof.

In popular culture
The boss button has appeared on every NCAA tournament since the 2005 NCAA men's basketball tournament website for March Madness, which allowed viewers to watch every game.

Alternatives
On modern operating systems, applications may be minimized or switched to the background with a keyboard shortcut. Under desktop environments with multiple workspaces, one possibility is to maintain one "boss" workspace and to switch to it when the boss is coming. A 2014 newspaper article titled "How to watch the Olympics at work without getting caught" described a Mozilla Firefox feature that provides a keyboard shortcut named PanicButton.

A physical privacy option introduced by 3M as a glare-filter also has the side benefit of blocking casual passersby from seeing any content until "directly in front of the screen."

References

Video game culture
History of software